Cooper Bluffs are high, ice-covered coastal bluffs on the east side of Zykov Glacier, near the mouth of the glacier, in the Anare Mountains, a major mountain range lying within Victoria Land, Antarctica. They were named by the Australian National Antarctic Research Expeditions (ANARE) for Flying Officer G. Cooper, Royal Australian Air Force, a member of the RAAF Antarctic Flight with the ANARE (Thala Dan), 1962, which explored the area. The bluffs lie situated on the Pennell Coast, a portion of Antarctica lying between Cape Williams and Cape Adare.

References
 

Cliffs of Victoria Land
Pennell Coast